Irving Township (T9N R3W) is located in Montgomery County, Illinois, United States. As of the 2010 census, its population was 1,006 and it contained 454 housing units.

Geography

Demographics

Adjacent townships
 Rountree Township (north)
 Nokomis Township (northeast)
 Witt Township (east)
 Fillmore Township (southeast)
 East Fork Township (south)
 Hillsboro Township (southwest)
 Butler Grove Township (west)
 Raymond Township (northwest)

References

External links
City-data.com
Illinois State Archives
Historical Society of Montgomery County

Townships in Montgomery County, Illinois
1872 establishments in Illinois
Townships in Illinois